Hey Laura may refer to:

 Laura Welsh (born 1986), an English indie pop singer, also known as Hey Laura
 "Hey Laura", a 2013 song by Gregory Porter from the album Liquid Spirit